List of UN resolutions concerning Israel and Palestine may refer to:
List of United Nations resolutions concerning Israel
List of United Nations resolutions concerning Palestine